The taxonomy of Tulipa places the genus in the family Liliaceae, and subdivides it as four subgenera, and comprises about 75 species.

History 
While tulips were known from at least the 12th century in Persia, and appear in decorative art in Turkey in the 13th century, the first description in European botanical literature, was by Conrad Gesner in his De Hortus Germanica (1561), which he referred to as Tulipa turcarum, and states he saw in a garden in Augsburg in 1559.

Phylogeny 
The taxonomy of Tulipa has always been complex and difficult for many reasons. Tulipa is a genus of the Liliaceae (lily) family, once one of the largest family of monocots, but which molecular phylogenetics has shown to be a much smaller discrete family with only 15 genera. Within Liliaceae, Tulipa is placed within Lilioideae, one of three subfamilies, with two tribes. Tribe Lilieae includes seven other genera in addition to Tulipa. Some species with a more eastern distribution (China, Korea, Japan) formerly classified as Tulipa are now considered as the separate genus Amana, including Amana edulis (Tulipa edulis). These species are more closely allied to Erythronium, although some authors believe that all three genera of the Tulipeae could be treated as a single genus.

The evolutionary and phylogenetic relationships between the genera currently included in Liliaceae are shown in this Cladogram.

Subdivision

Subgenera and sections
Historically, subdivision of the genus and speciation (separation of species) has been based on vegetative and floral characters, but further research has shown these to be quite plastic, even within a species. Together with population variability, hybridisation and naturalisation, the classification and taxonomy of tulips has been complex and controversial.

The genus Tulipa was traditionally divided into two sections, Eriostemones and Tulipa (as Leiostemones), and comprises about 76 species. In 1997, the two sections were raised to subgenera and subgenus Tulipa was divided into five sections:
 Clusianae
 Eichleres
 subdivided into eight series
 Kopalkowskiana
 Tulipanum
 Tulipa
Subgenus Eriostemones was divided into the sections:
 Biflores
 Sylvestres
 Saxatiles

In 2009, two other subgenera were proposed, Clusianae and Orithyia, and this total of four subgenera was corroborated by a 2013 study by Maarten Christenhusz and colleagues. That study did not find support for any of the previous sections proposed, and since hybridisation is relatively common, it is probably better to refrain from subdividing the subgenera any further.

Species
Historically there has been considerable disagreement about the number of species within the genus. For instance tulips often grow in remote inaccessible hills and valleys where winters are harsh and summers long and dry, and may flower for only a short period, meaning that species are often missed. Furthermore, descriptions of species were often derived from studying cultivated bulbs, and the variability of the wild population was poorly understood. Many of these species were never identified in the wild. These taxonomic difficulties are those associated with long established cultivation, hybridisation, selection and naturalisation. Treatments of the genus vary considerably in how they deal with speciation, with some, such as the Flora Europaea (1980), taking a very broad approach, and others a much more narrow approach. For example, a broad approach treats T. orphanidea as a single variable species with a range of forms, while those using a narrow approach divide the species into T. bithynica, T. hageri and T. whittallii.

The number of accepted species has varied between 50 and 114, for instance The Plant List (2013) includes 113. A 2013 review lists 76, as described here. This list was used as the basis for Kew Gardens monograph of that year, The Genus Tulipa.

Subgenus Clusianae
Tulipa clusiana Redouté (lady tulip) - Greece, Iran, Iraq, Afghanistan, Pakistan, W Himalayas
Tulipa harazensis Rech.f. - Iran
Tulipa linifolia Regel (Bokhara tulip)  - Iran, Afghanistan, Tajikistan, Uzbekistan
Tulipa montana Lindl. - Turkmenistan, Iran

Subgenus Orithyia
Tulipa heteropetala Ledeb.  - Altay Krai, Kazakhstan, Xinjiang
Tulipa heterophylla (Regel) Baker - Kazakhstan, Xinjiang, Kyrgyzstan
Tulipa sinkiangensis Z.M.Mao - Xinjiang
Tulipa uniflora (L.) Besser ex Baker (Siberian tulip) - Siberia, Mongolia, Xinjiang, Inner Mongolia, Kazakhstan

Subgenus Tulipa

Tulipa agenensis Redouté (eyed tulip)  - Greece, Middle East
Tulipa albanica Kit Tan & Shuka (Albanian tulip) - Albania
Tulipa alberti Regel (Albert's tulip) - - Kazakhstan, Kyrgyzstan
Tulipa aleppensis Boiss. ex Regel (Aleppo tulip)- Turkey, Syria, Lebanon
Tulipa altaica Pall. ex Spreng. (Altai tulip)  - Altai Krai, Western Siberia, Kazakhstan, Xinjiang
Tulipa anisophylla Vved.  - Tajikistan
Tulipa armena Boiss. (Armenian tulip) - Turkey, Iran, South Caucasus
Tulipa banuensis Grey-Wilson (Afghan tulip) - Afghanistan
Tulipa borszczowii Regel - Kazakhstan
Tulipa botschantzevae S.N.Abramova & Zakal. - Turkmenistan, Iran 
Tulipa butkovii Botschantz. - Uzbekistan 
Tulipa carinata Vved. (Pamir tulip) - Tajikistan, Uzbekistan, Afghanistan
Tulipa cypria Stapf ex Turrill (Cyprian tulip) - Cyprus
Tulipa dubia Vved. - Uzbekistan, Kyrgyzstan, Kazakhstan
Tulipa eichleri Regel (Eichler's tulip)  - Turkey, Iran, Caucasus, accepted by the World Flora Online  but regarded as a synonym of T. undulatifolia by others 
Tulipa faribae Ghahr., Attar & Ghahrem.-Nejad - Iran 
Tulipa ferganica Vved. - Uzbekistan, Kyrgyzstan
Tulipa foliosa - Turkey
Tulipa fosteriana W.Irving - Afghanistan, Central Asia
Tulipa × gesneriana L. (garden tulip)
Tulipa greigii Regel (maculate tulip) - Iran, Central Asia
Tulipa heweri Raamsd. - Afghanistan
Tulipa hissarica Popov & Vved. - Tajikistan, Uzbekistan
Tulipa hoogiana B.Fedtsch.  - Turkmenistan, Iran
Tulipa hungarica Borbás (Rhodope tulip) - Hungary, Serbia, Bulgaria
Tulipa iliensis Regel - Kazakhstan, Kyrgyzstan, Xinjiang
Tulipa ingens (Tubergen's tulip) - Tajikistan, Uzbekistan
Tulipa julia K.Koch (Julia tulip)  - Turkey, South Caucasus, Syria, Lebanon
Tulipa kaufmanniana Regel (waterlily tulip) - Central Asia
Tulipa kolpakowskiana Regel (sun tulip) - Kazakhstan, Kyrgyzstan, Xinjiang, Afghanistan
Tulipa korolkowii Regel - Central Asia
Tulipa kosovarica Kit Tan, Shuka & Krasniqi - Kosovo
Tulipa kuschkensis B.Fedtsch. - Turkmenistan, Afghanistan, Iran
Tulipa lanata Regel - Tajikistan, Afghanistan, Pakistan, W Himalayas
Tulipa lehmanniana Merckl. (Lehmann's tulip)  - Afghanistan, Iran, Central Asia
Tulipa lemmersii - Kazakhstan
Tulipa ostrowskiana Regel - Kazakhstan, Kyrgyzstan
Tulipa persica (Lindl.) Sweet (Persian tulip) - Iran
Tulipa platystemon Vved. - Kyrgyzstan
Tulipa praestans H.B.May (multiflowered tulip)  - Tajikistan
Tulipa scardica Bornm. (Balkan tulip) - Kosovo, Greece
Tulipa scharipovii Tojibaev - Kyrgyzstan, Uzbekistan
Tulipa schmidtii Fomin - Iran, South Caucasus
Tulipa serbica Tatic & Krivošej - Kosovo, Serbia
Tulipa sosnowskyi Achv. & Mirzoeva - South Caucasus
Tulipa suaveolens (= Tulipa schrenkii)  Roth (scented or Crimean tulip, Schrenck's tulip)  - Ukraine, Crimea, Russia and south of Siberia, Caucasus, Iran, Kazakhastan
Tulipa subquinquefolia Vved. - Tajikistan, Uzbekistan
Tulipa systola Stapf - Middle East
Tulipa talassica Lazkov - Kyrgyzstan
Tulipa tetraphylla Regel  - Xinjiang, Kazakhstan, Kyrgyzstan
Tulipa × tschimganica Botschantz. - Kazakhstan, Uzbekistan
Tulipa ulophylla Wendelbo - Iran 
Tulipa undulatifolia Boiss. - Greece, Balkans, Caucasus, Middle East, Iran, Central Asia
Tulipa micheliana Hoog – Central Asia to N.E. Iran, accepted by the World Checklist of Selected Plant Families , but regarded as a synonym of T. undulatifolia by others.
Tulipa uzbekistanica Botschantz. & Sharipov  - Uzbekistan
Tulipa vvedenskyi Botschantz. - Tajikistan

Subgenus Eriostemones

Tulipa biflora Pall. (two-flowered tulip) - Macedonia, Egypt, Crimea, Russia, Asia from Saudi Arabia to Xinjiang + Western Siberia
Tulipa bifloriformis Vved. - Central Asia
Tulipa cinnabarina K.Perss. - Turkey
Tulipa cretica Boiss. & Heldr. (Cretan tulip) - Crete
Tulipa dasystemon (Regel) Regel - Central Asia, Xinjiang
Tulipa humilis Herb. (rainbow tulip) - Caucasus, Middle East
Tulipa kolbintsevii Zonn. - Kazakhstan
Tulipa koyuncui Eker & Babaç - Turkey
Tulipa orithyioides Vved.  - Central Asia
Tulipa orphanidea Boiss. & Heldr. (syn. T. hageri) (green or orange wild tulip) - Greece, Bulgaria, Turkey
Tulipa regelii Krassn. (plicate or Regel's tulip) - Kazakhstan
Tulipa saxatilis Sieber ex Spreng. (syn. T. bakeri) (rock tulip) - Greece, Turkey
Tulipa subbiflora Vved.
Tulipa sprengeri Baker  - Turkey 
Tulipa sylvestris L. (wild tulip) - Eurasia from Portugal to Xinjiang
Tulipa turkestanica (Regel) Regel - Central Asia, Xinjiang
Tulipa urumiensis Stapf (tarda tulip) - Kazakhstan, Kyrgyzstan, Iran

Unplaced
The horned tulip is often offered in the trade as "Tulipa acuminata", but is in fact a cultivar, unknown from the wild, and should be distributed under its correct cultivar name: Tulipa 'Cornuta'.
Tulipa boettgeri Regel – Central Asia; accepted by the World Checklist of Selected Plant Families , but regarded as unplaced by Christenhusz et al.

Species reclassified to other genera
These species were classified as Tulipa but are now placed in other genera
Tulipa anhuiensis X.S.Shen, now: Amana anhuiensis (X.S.Shen) Christenh.
Tulipa breyniana L., now: Moraea collina Thunb. (Iridaceae).
Tulipa edulis (Miq.) Baker, now: Amana edulis (Miq.) Honda.
Tulipa erythronioides Baker, now: Amana erythronioides (Baker) D.Y.Tan & D.Y.Hong.
Tulipa graminifolia Baker ex S.Moore, now: Amana edulis (Miq.) Honda.
Tulipa latifolia (Makino) Makino, now: Amana erythronioides (Baker) D.Y.Tan & D.Y.Hong
Tulipa ornithogaloides Fisch. ex Besser, now: Gagea triflora (Ledeb.) Schult. & Schult.f.
Tulipa pudica (Pursh) Raf., now: Fritillaria pudica (Pursh) Spreng.
Tulipa sibthorpiana Sm., now: Fritillaria sibthorpiana (Sm.) Baker.

Etymology
This may have been due to a translation error in early times, when it was fashionable in the Ottoman Empire to wear tulips on turbans. The translator possibly confused the flower for the turban.

Notes

References

Bibliography

Books 
 
 , In 
 
 
  see also Species Plantarum
  In

Articles

Websites 
 , see also Angiosperm Phylogeny Website

External links 
 
 

Tulipa
Tulipa